Huperzia serrata, the toothed clubmoss, is a plant known as a firmoss which contains the acetylcholinesterase inhibitor huperzine A. The species is native to eastern Asia (China, Tibet, Japan, the Korean peninsula, the Russian Far East).

References

serrata
Flora of China
Flora of Eastern Asia
Flora of the Russian Far East